The Cathedral of Our Lady of Bzommar is the cathedral church of the Armenian Catholic Church in Prado (Montevideo), Uruguay as Co-cathedral of Armenian Catholic Apostolic Exarchate of Latin America and Mexico.

The temple is dedicated to Our Lady of Bzommar, the patron of Armenian Catholics. It is a significant religious center for the local Armenian community.

Same devotion
There is another church in Montevideo dedicated to Our Lady of Bzommar: the Parish Church of Our Lady of Bzommar in La Comercial.

See also
 Catholic Church in Uruguay
 List of cathedrals in Uruguay
 Surp Nerses Shnorhali Cathedral
 Armenians in Uruguay
Armenian Catholic Apostolic Exarchate of Latin America and Mexico

References

External links

 
 
Church buildings in Montevideo
Eastern Catholic cathedrals in Uruguay
Armenian Catholic cathedrals
Armenian churches in Uruguay
Prado, Montevideo